Minoan Flying Dolphins (MFD) was a Greek passenger and freight ferry company.

History
MFD was established in 1998 by Pantelis Sfinias as a subsidiary of Minoan Lines.
Sfinias had convinced many prominent Greek businessmen to purchase stakes in MFD. His plan was to use the raised capital for purchasing small traditional ferry companies and eventually consolidate the Greek ferry industry.
MFD's first acquisition was Ceres Flying Dolphins owned by the Livanos family, a hydrofoils company active in the Argo-Saronic Gulf and the Sporades islands.
Within a few months, MFD grew rapidly through a barrage of buyouts that targeted companies such as Agapitos, Agoudimos, Nomikos, Ventouris, Goutos, etc.
Soon, MFD controlled a market share exceeding 90% in several routes.
In addition to its fleet of conventional vessels, MFD operated a number of high-speed craft ordered from Austal, Australia.

However, plans of taking the company public collapsed after the Greek stock market crash in the fall of 1999 and the sinking of MFD's MS Express Samina on 26 September 2000, in which 82 people perished.
Two months later, under strong pressure from the stockholders and the media, Sfinias committed suicide by throwing himself out of his sixth floor office window.

MFD was renamed to Hellas Flying Dolphins in the summer of 2001 and finally to Hellenic Seaways in 2005. Minoan Lines continued to own a large stake exceeding 30% in Hellenic Seaways until 2018, when it was sold to Attica Group.

See also
Hellenic Seaways

References

Ferry companies of Greece
Shipping companies of Greece
Companies based in Piraeus
Transport companies established in 1998
Defunct shipping companies
Defunct transport companies of Greece